Grown Up is a 1993 7 minute 16mm short animated film by Joanna Priestley, using drawings on paper, pixellated hands and object animation.  The film was written by Barbara Carnegie and Joanna Priestley, and directed, produced, and animated by Priestley.

Synopsis
Grown Up takes a humorous and poignant look at what it means to be turning 40 and growing older.

Release
The film was re-released on DVD in 2006 by Microcinema International.  It was screened in a retrospective of Priestley's works in April 2009.

Reception
“In a time when everyone seems to be writing about aging, Priestley does a brilliant job of reclaiming 40 and her own process of middle aging with humor, optimism and an award winning animation style that just might make twenty-somethings wish they were older.” -Bill Foster, Northwest Film Center

Awards and recognition
First Prize, Marin County Film Festival
First Prize,  Worldfest Houston
Gold Award, Black Maria Film and Video Festival
Directorâs Citation Award, Worldfest Charleston
Gold Award, Columbus International Film Festival
Honorable Mention, Intercom International Festival
Certificates of Merit:
Athens International Film and Video Festival
Ottawa International Animation Festival
USA Film Festival
Stuttgart Animation Festival
San Francisco International Film Festival
Sinking Creek Film Festival.

Selected Festivals:  New York Film Festival, Telluride Film Festival, Northwest Film and Video Festival:

References

External links
 Grown Up at the Internet Movie Database

1993 films
1993 animated films
1990s American animated films
American animated short films
Films directed by Joanna Priestley
1990s English-language films